Baliochila confusa is a butterfly in the family Lycaenidae. It is found in Kenya. Its habitat consists of forests and woodland.

Adults are on wing in October.

References

Butterflies described in 2004
Poritiinae
Endemic insects of Kenya
Butterflies of Africa